John or Johnny Meadows may refer to:

John Meadows III (1944–2018), American politician
John Armstrong Taylor Meadows (1817–1875), British interpreter and merchant in China
Johnny Meadows (Australian footballer) (1880–1974), Australian rules footballer for Essendon
Johnny Meadows (English footballer) (born 1930), English footballer
John Condrone, also known as Johnny Meadows, American professional wrestler